Edward Burgin (29 April 1927 – 26 March 2019) was an English professional footballer who played 551 times in the Football League as a goalkeeper for Sheffield United, Doncaster Rovers, Leeds United and Rochdale. He played twice for England B, and was a non-playing member of England's squad for the 1954 World Cup.

Career
Burgin started his career with Alford Town. Following a trial he signed for Sheffield United in March 1949. He was ever-present during three 3 League seasons: 1950–51, 1952–53 and 1953–54, and between 12 November 1949 and 15 March 1952 made 102 consecutive league appearances.

After 314 appearances for United, including 281 League games and 20 FA Cup ties, he moved to Doncaster Rovers for a £3,000 fee, as replacement for Harry Gregg who had joined Manchester United. After only five first-team games, he broke his collarbone. In 1958, he joined Leeds United making 58 league appearances for the West Yorkshire side. In 1960, he joined Rochdale, where he spent six seasons, making 207 league appearances and playing in the 1962 Football League Cup Final. He went on to be player-manager of Glossop.

During his time with Sheffield United, Burgin was regarded as one of the best goalkeepers in the country. He toured Australia with the Football Association's team in 1951, was a reserve for England's match with Austria in 1951, won two caps for England B in 1954 and was selected in England's squad for the 1954 World Cup, although he did not feature in any of their matches.

Career statistics

Notes

References

External links
 

1927 births
2019 deaths
Footballers from Sheffield
English footballers
England B international footballers
Association football goalkeepers
Sheffield United F.C. players
Leeds United F.C. players
Doncaster Rovers F.C. players
Rochdale A.F.C. players
Glossop North End A.F.C. players
1954 FIFA World Cup players
English Football League players
English football managers
Glossop North End A.F.C. managers